The Września school strike, or Września children strike, refers to the 1901–1904 protests in Września of Polish children and their parents against Germanisation of the schools.

Background

In all of Greater Poland, which was annexed by Germany during the late-18th-century partitions of Poland, German was the language of instruction in schools from 1873 except in two subjects: religion and music.

In March 1901, the German administration ordered the religion classes to switch to German.

Strike
In April, a number of students (one source gives the number at 118) in the Catholic People's School in Września (Katolicka Szkoła Ludowa we Wrześni), attended by about 650 pupils, refused to accept new German textbooks and to participate in the class activities. The teachers responded with detention and corporal punishment. Over the coming weeks, the students' parents became increasingly vocal in protesting the punishment of their children. On 20 May, a group of 100 to 200 people were protesting in front of the school until they were dispersed by police, who were called for by the school. The German administration threatened the students of not being allowed to finish school. Adults involved in the protests were put on trial for public disturbance, preventing the officials from carrying out their duties, trespassing, and similar crimes, and 26 people were officially charged, and on 19 November 1901, 20 individuals were sentenced to imprisonment from several weeks to over two years.

Polish activists formed two committees to support families whose members were imprisoned. The German administration soon disbanded the committees and, in turn, charged the activists.

Despite the trials, the protests continued. Some parents moved their children to other schools, and the school officials constructed barracks, where the protesting children were isolated. Use of the Polish language was banned on the school grounds, and police were in charge of enforcing student attendance.

After an amnesty for children was declared in 1903, the number of children still refusing to take the German religion lessons diminished. The last striking children gave up by the summer of 1904.

Aftermath
The strike gained international attention. In late 1901, the Polish composer Ignacy Paderewski declared that proceeds from his concert in Germany would be given to the Września activists. He was booed and boycotted by German audiences. As a result, he refused to perform in Germany. The cause was taken up by other Polish cultural figures, such as writers Henryk Sienkiewicz and Maria Konopnicka.

The Września strike inspired another large strike of Polish students in 1907.

The issue was documented in what has been described as the oldest Polish film, Prussian Culture, made in 1908 by Mojżesz Towbin. Another movie about the events, Wizja lokalna, 1901, was made in 1981 by Filip Bajon.

References

Sources
 
 Stanisław A. Blejwas, American Polonia and the School Strike in Września, 
  L. Kostrzewski, "Przebieg strajku szkolnego we Wrześni w 1901 roku", w: Strajk szkolny we Wrześni w 1901 r., Września 2001
  Monika Warneńska,  Ulica dzieci wrzesińskich. Krajowa Agencja Wydawnicza, 1983.
  Strajk dzieci wrzesińskich z perspektywy wieku, opracowanie zbiorowe pod redakcją Stanisława Sierpowskiego. Bogucki Wydawnictwo Naukowe, Poznań, Września 2001.

1901 in Poland
1901 in Germany
Student strikes
Province of Posen
Germany–Poland relations
Anti-Polish sentiment in Europe
Września